The women's cross-country competition of the cycling events at the 2011 Pan American Games was held on October 15 at the Pan American Mountain Bike Circuit in Tapalpa. The defending Pan American Games champion is Catharine Pendrel of the Canada, while the defending Pan American Championship, champion is Angela Carolina Parra Sierra of Colombia. The race became the first event completed at the 2011 Pan American Games.

Heather Irmiger of the United States won the gold medal, thus becoming the first champion at these games.

Schedule
All times are Central Standard Time (UTC-6).

Results
13 competitors from 11 countries were scheduled to compete.

Did not finish

References

Cycling at the 2011 Pan American Games
Mountain biking at the Pan American Games
Pan